This is about the novel by Engracio Valmonte. For the painting by Juan Luna, see Una Mestiza.

Ang Mestisa (The Mestiza) is a well-known Tagalog-language novel written by Filipino novelist Engracio L. Valmonte in 1920. Published in two parts, the novel was divided into two books entitled Ang Mestisa Unang Bahagi (The Mestiza Part One) and Ang Mestisa Ikalawang Bahagi (The Mestiza Part Two). The novel was published in Manila, Philippines by the Imprenta Ilagan y Compañia in 1921. It was printed by the Imprenta Nacional during the American period in Philippine history. Later on, the novel was adapted as a zarzuela.

Description
The setting of the novel was the way of life in the high-levels of Philippine society. The main characters of the story are Elsa (the mestiza), Tirso Silveira (a poet and lawyer), and Teang (the female college student). The main focus of the novel is Elsa, who being a mestiza of Spanish descent, was the representation of arrogance, selfishness, and contemptuousness of the Filipino lower-class. Elsa fell in love with Tirso Silveira but Silveira fell in love with Teang, the representation of coyness or diffidence, kindness, and warmth. Elsa and Teang are opposites of one another. The love triangle, despite of Elsa's plans to win Silveira’s heart, resulted in the union of Silveira and Teang. Elsa, as a consequence of her failure, succumbs to insanity.

See also
Busabos ng Palad

References

External links
Ang Mestisa Unang Bahagi (Chapters I to XIV) at Filipiniana.net
Ang Mestisa Ikalawang Bahagi (Chapters XV to XXVII) at Filipiniana.net
Ang Mestisa by Engracio Valmonte at Project Gutenberg

Philippine novels
Tagalog-language novels
1920 novels
Philippine romance novels
Novels set in the Philippines